The Kananaskis Range is a mountain range west of the Kananaskis River in the Canadian Rockies. Many of the peaks are named after ships and people involved in the Battle of Jutland. 

Mount Bogart is named after D.B. Dowling.  Bogart was his mother's maiden name and his middle name.  D.B. Dowling surveyed the area in the early 1900s for the Geographical Society of Canada. Tower was named after Francis George Towers an early homesteader of the region.  Mt McDougal another early  homesteader Archie McDougal of Carstairs.  Mts. Evans Thomas named after Thomas Oldham Evans an early homesteader.

Peaks of this range include:

References

Ranges of the Canadian Rockies
Mountain ranges of Alberta